The Act of Federation of 1576, (popularly known as the Union of Delft) was signed on 25 April 1576 by William the Silent, Prince of Orange, and the provinces of Holland and Zeeland in the Netherlands and made a definitive federation of the two provinces. It also made William the effective head of the federation, granted him supreme authority in war and allowed him to call a States General when he pleased with the aim of more effectively gathering resources and planning operations in the Eighty Years' War.

Some of stadtholders of the provinces saw the Union of Delft as a threat to their power. The three Stadtholders, Lambers, Van Gessel and De Witte tried to turn their provinces against the Union, but they were halted in their tracks by the mastermind behind the Union, Martin Drent.

See also
Eighty Years' War

References

1576 in the Habsburg Netherlands
1576 in law